Raja Makutam is a 1960 Indian swashbuckler film, produced and directed by B. N. Reddy under the Vauhini Studios banner. Filmed simultaneously in Telugu and Tamil languages, it stars N. T. Rama Rao and Rajasulochana , with music composed by Master Venu.

Plot 

During the time of a festival, the King of Gandhara was killed by his younger brother Prachanda the army commander of the kingdom. At that time, Prince Pratap was away, learns about his father's death, and returns to the kingdom. On the way, Prachanda makes an unsuccessful attempt to eliminate the prince, Pratap to place his son Bhajaranga on the throne, where he is wounded. While he is unconscious, a girl Pramila belonging to a rebel group takes him to the palace on her cart. Believing his uncle Prachanda's words, Pratap orders the execution of a few persons held responsible for his father's murder and they include Pramila's brother and rebel leader Soorasena's father. Pramila vows to kill Pratap not knowing the Paradesi she met and Pratap are the same. Meanwhile, Pratap learns that Prachanda was responsible for his father's death. His mother restrains him from taking revenge immediately and advises him to first win the people's confidence and set up an army to fight the powerful Prachanda. The cloak and dagger drama follows. Pratap acts like a madman, disguises himself as a black cobra, leads the rebel gang, kills Prachanda, ascends the throne, and marries Pramila.

Cast 
Telugu
N. T. Rama Rao as Prince Pratapa Simha
Rajasulochana as Prameela
Kannamba as Queen Mother
Gummadi as Prachanda
Rajanala as Soorasena
Padmanabham as Bhajaranga Simha
Kasturi Siva Rao as Shambhu
Vangara

Tamil
The list is adapted from Film News Anandan's database.
N. T. Rama Rao
Rajasulochana
Kannamba
V. R. Rajagopal
V. Nagayya
S. V. Sahasranamam
K. Balaji

Soundtrack 
Music is by Master Venu. There are about 11 songs in the film.

Telugu Songs

Lyrics were by Balantrapu Rajanikanta Rao, Devulapalli Krishnasastri and Kosaraju Raghavaiah.

Tamil Songs

Lyrics were penned by Thanjai Ramaiah Dass.

References

External links 
 

1960 films
1960s Tamil-language films
1960s Telugu-language films
Indian black-and-white films
Indian swashbuckler films
Indian multilingual films
Films directed by B. N. Reddy
Films scored by Master Venu